Henry Seymour Chase Jr. (February 2, 1853 in Woodstock, Vermont – October 1, 1889 in Sewanee, Tennessee), better known by his professional name Harry Chase, was an American artist who specialized in marine paintings.

Birth and early life 

Harry Chase was born on February 2, 1853, to Dr. Henry Seymour Chase and Sarah Denison Chase (née Haskell) in Woodstock, Vermont. In 1857, the family moved to Independence, Iowa, where Dr. Chase tried his hand at farming. Harry grew up in Iowa, and showed an early interest in art. From 1865-1868, the Chase family lived in Iowa City, Iowa, where Harry received his first comprehensive art instruction and also matriculated to the State University of Iowa in the city.

In 1868, the Chases moved to St. Louis, Missouri, where the elder Chase took a position as the Chair of Operative Surgery at the Missouri Dental College.

Formal studies and early career 

In 1868, Chase joined the atelier of displaced Southern aristocrat and itinerant portrait painter, James Reeve Stuart, who kept his studio on Olive Street in St. Louis. Chase studied under Stuart until 1870, when he departed for New York where he entered the Antique Class under Lemuel Wilmarth at the National Academy of Design.

Returning to St. Louis in 1871, Chase had determined to further his studies at the Bavarian Royal Academy of Fine Arts in Munich. In the summer of 1872, Chase departed St. Louis for Munich with another young hopeful, William Merritt Chase (no known relation), and they traveled together to Europe. Harry Chase studied in Munich from 1872 until 1875.

Chase returned to St. Louis in 1876, where he staged a very successful solo show and auction, selling 40 works and pocketing enough from the profits to return to Europe to study in Paris.

Before he left, he married Laura Emeline Eames in January 1877. She was known to family and friends as Emma. Together, Chase and his bride left St. Louis for Paris, where he would study under Paul Constant Soyer for two years. During his time in Paris under Soyer, Chase had a painting accepted to the Salon de Paris in 1878, establishing a reputation for himself as an up-and-coming artist in the broader United States.

In 1879, Chase changed masters and became the protégé of Hendrik Willem Mesdag, the great Dutch marine painter, in Scheveningen, the Netherlands. It was Mesdag and Dutch Impressionism that would have the greatest influence on Chase's style. Under Mesdag, Chase was again successful in having a painting accepted at the Salon de Paris of 1879.

At the end of 1879, Chase returned to St. Louis and held another even more successful solo show and auction, selling a total of 64 works.

Manhattan 

In the 1880s, Chase established himself as one of the most notable artists in the United States, opening a studio in Manhattan, and exhibiting at the most important exhibitions around the country. During the summers, he could often be found sailing in New Bedford, Massachusetts, on his yacht Bonnie, using her as a mobile studio. In 1883, he was elected an Associate of the National Academy of Design. In 1885, he won the Hallgarten Prize for his painting New York Harbor, North River, now part of the collection of the Katzen Arts Center of the American University, Washington D.C.<

Harry Chase was elected a member of the following artists' societies and clubs during his career:

 A.N.A., National Academy of Design
 Board of Control, American Art Union
 Member, American Water Color Society
 Vice President, Salmagundi Sketch Club
 Member, Artists' Fund Society
 Member, Boston Art Club
 Member, St. Louis Sketch Club
 Academician, St. Louis Academy of Fine Arts

Exhibitions 

 1869-1888 - St. Louis Fair & Expo
 1874 & 1875 - Kunstverein, Munich, Germany
 1875-1885 - Brooklyn Art Association
 1878 & 1879 - Salon de Paris
 1878, 1880-1889 - National Academy of Design, Annual Exhibitions. He was awarded the 1885 First Hallgarten Prize for New York Harbor—North River. 
 1880s - Salmagundi Sketch Club, American Water Color Society, Philadelphia Academy of the Fine Arts, Philadelphia Society of Artists, Boston Art Club, Southern Exposition, Chicago Interstate Industrial, New England Manufacturers and Mechanics Institute.
 1883 - International Art Exhibition, Munich, Germany

Illness and death 

At the end of 1885, Chase became insane and his career came to an abrupt end. From 1886 to 1889, Chase was treated for his ailments in both Poughkeepsie, New York, at the Hudson River State Asylum for the Insane, and later in Sewanee, Tennessee, under the treatment of Dr. William M. Harlow. Chase died in Sewanee on October 1, 1889, and was brought back to St. Louis where he was buried in Bellefontaine Cemetery.

Gallery

References

External links 
 The Thrill of the Chase, A Detective Story. Misattributed painting reattributed to Harry Chase.
 Official Website of Harry Chase, Artist

19th-century American painters
1853 births
1889 deaths
Artists from St. Louis
People from Woodstock, Vermont
People from Independence, Iowa